German submarine U-36 was a Type VIIA U-boat of Nazi Germany's Kriegsmarine which served during World War II. She was constructed in the earliest days of the U-boat arm at Kiel in 1936, and served in the pre-war Navy in the Baltic Sea and North Sea under Kapitänleutnant (Kptlt.) Klaus Ewerth. Korvettenkapitän (K.Kapt.)Wilhelm Fröhlich took command in October 1938 and continued in the role until the boat was lost.

She was lost with all hands.

Construction and design

Construction

U-36 was ordered by the Kriegsmarine on 25 March 1935 as part of the German Plan Z and in violation of the Treaty of Versailles. Her keel was laid down in the AG Weser shipyard in Bremen as yard number 559 on 2 March 1936. After about eight months of construction, she was launched on 4 November 1936 and commissioned on 16 December under the command of Kptlt. Klaus Ewerth.

Design

Like all Type VIIA submarines, U-36 displaced  while surfaced and  when submerged. U-36s propulsion consisted of two MAN 6-cylinder 4-stroke M6V 40/46 diesel engines that totaled . Her maximum rpm was between 470 and 485. The submarine was also equipped with two Brown, Boveri & Cie GG UB 720/8 electric motors that totaled . Their maximum rpm was 322. These engines gave U-36 a total speed of  while surfaced and  when submerged. The U-boat's test depth was  but she could go as deep as  without having her hull crushed.

U-36s armament consisted of five  torpedo tubes (four located in the bow and one in the stern). She could have up to 11 torpedoes on board or 22 TMA or 33 TMB mines. U-36 was also equipped with a 8.8 cm SK C/35 naval gun and had 220 rounds for it stowed on board. Her anti-aircraft defenses consisted of one  anti-aircraft gun.

Service history

First war patrol
U-36 was at sea when the war broke out, having set out from Wilhelmshaven on 31 August 1939. She arrived in Kiel on 6 September and the following day departed for her first war patrol. She then patrolled the North Sea for three weeks, hoping to catch ships traveling between Britain and Scandinavia carrying war supplies. During this patrol, the boat sank two steamers,  and —one British and the other from neutral Sweden—carrying British produce.

, a British submarine, later fired on U-36 and subsequently claimed to have sunk her, although in fact the torpedo missed. On 27 September Fröhlich and his crew captured another Swedish vessel, which he proceeded to escort back to Germany as the patrol came to an end. She returned to her berth in Kiel at the end of September, where she remained until December. During her first patrol, U-36 was also credited with having laid the mine that sank the Norwegian freighter, Solaas.

Second war patrol

The mission required coded messages to be flashed to Soviet naval vessels patrolling the area preceding a Soviet escort to the prospective base location.

However, U-36 never left the Norwegian Sea. On 4 December 1939, two days out of Wilhelmshaven, she was spotted on the surface near the Norwegian port of Stavanger by the British submarine . Salmon then fired one torpedo at her unwitting counterpart. It sank U-36, all 40 of the sailors aboard were lost.

Following the loss of U-36, U-38 continued towards the Kola Peninsula, successfully reaching the location and accomplished the scouting mission for Basis Nord.

Summary of raiding history

References

Bibliography

External links

 

1936 ships
German Type VIIA submarines
Military units and formations of Nazi Germany in the Spanish Civil War
Ships built in Kiel
Ships lost with all hands
U-boats commissioned in 1936
U-boats sunk by British submarines
U-boats sunk in 1939
World War II shipwrecks in the Norwegian Sea
World War II submarines of Germany
Maritime incidents in December 1939